Mohammad Ziaeipour (born March 14, 1989) is an Iranian footballer who plays for Saipa F.C. in the IPL.

Club career
Ashtiani has played his entire career for Saipa F.C.

References

1989 births
Living people
Saipa F.C. players
Iranian footballers
Association football defenders